Operation Tumbler–Snapper was a series of nuclear weapons tests conducted by the United States in early 1952 at the Nevada Test Site. The Tumbler–Snapper series of tests followed Operation Buster–Jangle and preceded Operation Ivy.

Tests

Tumbler
The Tumbler phase, sponsored by the Atomic Energy Commission, consisted of three airdrops intended to help explain discrepancies in the actual and estimated blast shock wave damage noted on previous detonations and to establish more accurately the optimal height of burst.

Snapper
The Snapper phase, sponsored by the Department of Defense, consisted of one airdrop and four tower shots intended to test various new weapons developments.

The military exercise Desert Rock IV, involving 7350 soldiers, took place during the test series. They trained during the Charlie, Dog, and George shots and observed shot Fox.

Aftermath 
The Tumbler-Snapper detonations included some particularly fallout heavy weapons. Of particular note is shot George, which contaminated more citizens than any other nuclear test in the United States. George alone accounted for some 7 percent of all population exposure to radiation during the 1,032 nuclear tests performed by the United States.

Summary

References

External links
 
 

Explosions in 1952
Tumbler-Snapper
1952 in military history
1952 in Nevada
1952 in the environment